Padež is name of several settlements:
 in Montenegro:
 Padež (Kolašin)
 in Serbia:
 Padež (Kruševac) 
 Padež (Leskovac)
 in Slovenia:
 Padež, Laško
 Padež, Vrhnika
 Padež, Zagorje ob Savi